Jireček Point is the point on the northwest coast of Smith Island in the South Shetland Islands, Antarctica forming the south side of the entrance to Cabut Cove and the northeast side of the entrance to Bourchier Cove.  Situated 1.1 km south-southeast of Markeli Point and 2.35 km north-northeast of Villagra Point.

The point is named after the settlements of Irechek in northeastern and Irechekovo in southeastern Bulgaria, in connection with the Czech historian and Bulgarian educator Konstantin Jireček (1854–1918).

Location
Bulgarian mapping in 2009.

Maps
Chart of South Shetland including Coronation Island, &c. from the exploration of the sloop Dove in the years 1821 and 1822 by George Powell Commander of the same. Scale ca. 1:200000. London: Laurie, 1822.
  L.L. Ivanov. Antarctica: Livingston Island and Greenwich, Robert, Snow and Smith Islands. Scale 1:120000 topographic map. Troyan: Manfred Wörner Foundation, 2010.  (First edition 2009. )
 South Shetland Islands: Smith and Low Islands. Scale 1:150000 topographic map No. 13677. British Antarctic Survey, 2009.
 Antarctic Digital Database (ADD). Scale 1:250000 topographic map of Antarctica. Scientific Committee on Antarctic Research (SCAR). Since 1993, regularly upgraded and updated.
 L.L. Ivanov. Antarctica: Livingston Island and Smith Island. Scale 1:100000 topographic map. Manfred Wörner Foundation, 2017.

References
 Bulgarian Antarctic Gazetteer. Antarctic Place-names Commission. (details in Bulgarian, basic data in English)
 Jireček Point. SCAR Composite Antarctic Gazetteer

External links
 Jireček Point. Copernix satellite image

Headlands of Smith Island (South Shetland Islands)
Bulgaria and the Antarctic